Magnus Liljedahl (born March 6, 1954 in Göteborg, Sweden) is an American sailor and Olympic champion. He competed at the 2000 Summer Olympics in Sydney, where he received a gold medal in the star class, together with Mark Reynolds.

Magnus Liljedahl currently runs a non-profit organization devoted to paralympic and Youth sailing named Team Paradise.

See also

 World Fit

References

External links
 Team Paradise Homepage
 
 
 

1954 births
Living people
ISAF World Sailor of the Year (male)
American male sailors (sport)
Olympic gold medalists for the United States in sailing
Sailors at the 2000 Summer Olympics – Star
Medalists at the 2000 Summer Olympics
Star class world champions
Swedish emigrants to the United States
US Sailor of the Year
World champions in sailing for the United States